Edathirinji  is a village in Thrissur district in the state of Kerala, India.

Niyamasabha Constituency : Irinjalakuda 

Loksabha Constituency : Thrissur

Demographics

 India census, Edathirinji had a population of 8,196 with 3,859 males and 4,337 females.

Edathirinji is a fast-growing village in Padiyoor Grama Panchayath.  It is located j west of Irinjalakuda Municipality in Thrissur district and is connected to both the NH 47 and the NH 17 highways. The government has recently labelled the road connected to both highways as a state highway. The main source of living in this village is agriculture.

Schools
HDPS Higher Secondary School (Thirath)
St.Mary's Lower Primary School (Kakkazha) 
R I Lower Primary School

Places of worship

Temples 

Sree Sivakumareswara Temple
Pothani Siva Temple
Sree Edachali Bhuvaneswari Temple 
Ayyankuzhi Sree Dharma Sastha Temple
Korath Sree Bhagavathi Temple
Kavalloor Family Temple
Annapoornesery Temple, Chettiyal 
Sree Darmadevi Thekkethalakkal Family Temple, Chettiyal
Anakkathiparambil Vishnumaaya Rudhiramaala Temple
Thekkoot Valooparambil Bhagavathy Temple
Ponnampully Sree Subrahmanniya Swami Temple, Marotikal 
Kollamparambil Sree Vishnumaya Temple
Elinjikottil Sree Bhadrakali Temple

Church 

 St Mary's Church Cheloor/Edathirinji

Mosques

Edathirinji Juma Masjid
Edathirinji Centre Juma Mazjid

References

External links
The Official Website Of Edathirinji

Villages in Thrissur district